Brenton Cabello Forns (born 26 September 1981 in Barcelona) is a Spanish medley swimmer who competed in the 2008 Summer Olympics.

Notes

References

External links
 
 
 
 

1981 births
Living people
Spanish male medley swimmers
Olympic swimmers of Spain
Swimmers at the 2008 Summer Olympics
Mediterranean Games bronze medalists for Spain
Mediterranean Games medalists in swimming
Swimmers at the 2005 Mediterranean Games